The rough shiner (Notropis baileyi) is a species of ray-finned fish in the genus Notropis. It is endemic to the  United States, where it is found in the upper Coastal Plain and Piedmont areas from Leaf and Chickasawhay rivers of the Pascagoula River drainage in Mississippi, east through the Mobile Bay drainage in Alabama to the lower Tallapoosa River system, and the Bear Creek system in the Tennessee River drainage.

References 

 

Notropis
Fish described in 1955